The New South Wales Greenhouse Gas Abatement Scheme (also known as GGAS) was a mandatory greenhouse gas emissions trading scheme that aimed to lower greenhouse gas emissions in New South Wales, Australia, to 7.27 tonnes of carbon dioxide per capita by the year 2007, which commenced on 1 January 2003.

The Scheme imposed obligations on NSW electricity retailers and certain other parties, including large electricity users who elected to manage their own benchmark to abate a portion of the greenhouse gas emissions attributable to their sales/consumption of electricity in NSW. They did this by purchasing and acquitting NSW Greenhouse Abatement Certificates (also known as NGACs), a type of carbon credit, created by accredited "Abatement Certificate Providers" (ACPs).

The NSW Minister for Energy, Chris Hartcher, announced closure of the scheme in April 2012, effective from 30 June 2012. The Greenhouse Gas Reduction Scheme (GGAS) closed on 30 June 2012. The NSW Government closed GGAS to avoid duplication with the Commonwealth’s carbon price which commenced on 1 July 2012.

See also
Jack's Gully
WSN Environmental Solutions
CO2 Australia Limited

References

External links
 Fact Sheet on Greenhouse and Energy
 The NSW Greenhouse Gas Office
 NGAC Creation
 Certificate Providers
 NGAC FAQ archived webpage

Climate change in Australia
Government of New South Wales
2003 establishments in Australia
2003 in the environment
Economic history of New South Wales